The Two-Man Band were an Australian band formed by Mike Brady and Peter Sullivan. They are best known for their number 1 single "Up There Cazaly". The song became the highest selling Australian single ever with sales of over 240,000 as of October 1979.

The band's final release "We're Gonna Grab That Cup" was released for the 1983 America's Cup Campaign.

Discography

Singles

Awards and nominations

TV Week / Countdown Awards
Countdown was an Australian pop music TV series on national broadcaster ABC-TV from 1974–1987, it presented music awards from 1979–1987, initially in conjunction with magazine TV Week. The TV Week / Countdown Awards were a combination of popular-voted and peer-voted awards.

|-
| 1979
| "Up There Cazaly"
| Most Popular Single
| 
|-

References

Australian musical duos
Musical groups established in 1978
Musical groups disestablished in 1983